= Royal Dutch =

Royal Dutch may refer to:

- Royal Dutch Petroleum Company, oil and gas company and predecessor to Shell plc
- Royal Dutch Airlines, commonly known as KLM

== See also ==
- Monarchy of the Netherlands
